Ira Harvey Smith (August 20, 1815 – April 18, 1883) was a Kansas state politician.

Smith, son of Ira and Rachel (Riggs) Smith, was born in that part of Derby which is now Seymour, Conn, August 20, 1815. He was for nearly two years a member of the class of Yale College which graduated in 1841, but graduated in 1842.

After having studied for three years in the Yale Divinity School, he was ordained pastor of the Congregational Church in North Haven, Conn., February 11, 1846. His health failing him, he was dismissed from this charge in March, 1848.  After five months' residence in the Massachusetts General Hospital in Boston, he undertook the supply of the pulpit in Prospect, Conn, but was very shortly obliged again to relinquish his profession for outdoor occupations.

From the spring of 1853 till the summer of 1854 he resided in California, and in the fall of 1854 joined the tide of free emigration to Kansas, where he remained for the rest of his life. There he was at first engaged in the public surveys of the territory, and also took up the business of land agent.  He was a member of the first Kansas State Legislature, as a Republican from Brown County, and in the summer of 1861 was appointed Receiver of the U. S. Land Office, first at Kickapoo and afterwards at Atchison.  He held this position until January, 1864, when he was made Register of the U. S. Land Office at Topeka, which he held until the summer of 1873.  In 1876 he became interested in the development of the San Juan country in southwestern Colorado, but retained his residence in Topeka, to which he returned in 1880, and where he died after a severe illness on April 18, 1883, in his 68th year. He was one of the founders of Washburn College in Topeka, and among its most generous benefactors.

He was married, February 26, 1846, to Sarah J., daughter of William Bartholomew, of Wolcott, Conn., who survived him with one son, a graduate of the Kansas State University.

External links
 Ira Harvey Smith papers at the Kansas Historical Society

1815 births
1883 deaths
People from Seymour, Connecticut
Yale Divinity School alumni
Republican Party members of the Kansas House of Representatives
Washburn University people
19th-century American politicians
People from Topeka, Kansas
Yale College alumni